Lionel Bony de Castellane (28 September 1891 – 29 November 1965) was a French fencer. He won a silver medal in the team foil event at the 1920 Summer Olympics.

References

External links
 

1891 births
1965 deaths
French male foil fencers
Olympic fencers of France
Fencers at the 1920 Summer Olympics
Olympic silver medalists for France
Olympic medalists in fencing
Sportspeople from Gironde
Medalists at the 1920 Summer Olympics